"Despierta" (English: Wake Up) was the first single from Edurne's debut album, Edurne. 
Gustav Efraimsson, a Swedish songwriter/producer,  co-wrote the song. The original title is "Erase delete be gone now" (listen song). The song was a huge success on radios while the CD Maxi single peaked at #5 in Spanish charts and sold more than 5,000 copies.

Track listing
 "Despierta" (Album Version) - 2:58
 "Despierta" (David Penn Remix) (Radio Edit) - 3:24
 "Despierta" (Caimillu Remix) - 3:56
 "Despierta" (David Penn Remix) (Extended) - 6:39

Charts

Spanish songs
Edurne songs
Spanish-language songs
Sony BMG singles
2006 songs